Ramiro de Lorca (1452–1502), also spelled Ramiro de Lorqua and referred to by Niccolò Machiavelli as Ramiro d'Orco, was a Spanish condottiero in the service of Cesare Borgia.

Biography
It is unknown when he traveled from Levante, Spain to the Italian peninsula and when he began to work for the Borgias, but it is known that by the time of Cesare Borgia's father's election as Pope Alexander VI, Ramiro was already held in confidence by Cesare, so much so that in his role as butler he accompanied Cesare to France in order to serve as a witness to his marriage to Charlotte of Albret in 1498.

In 1500, Cesare used the refusal of the lords of Romagna to pay tribute to the Pope as pretext to invade the region. Ramiro de Lorca participated in this campaign and captured the cities of Cesena and Forlì. Giovanni Olivieri, bishop of Isernia, was appointed ruler of the territory, while Ramiro became governor first of Forlì and then of Cesena, capital of the newly-proclaimed Grand Duchy of Romagna.

In October 1501, Ramiro became governor of the whole province and undertook the pacification of it, imposing a relentless regimen of torture and public executions that brought him the fear and hatred of the public. Disorder was mercilessly repressed, but Ramiro promoted peace between factions and initiated a program of public works.

On 29 January 1502 in Faenza, one criminal who was to be hanged escaped and sought refuge in a church. Ramiro did not hesitate and forced the priest to hand the criminal over, who was hanged from the window of that church, violating its sanctity. Additionally, he imposed a fine of 10,000 ducats on the citizens of the city, but they appealed to Cesare Borgia, who annulled it in a gesture of goodwill. In October, Ramiro decreed that the city council would not be convened with the sound of trumpets, as was traditional, but with the toll of church bells.

Meanwhile, a conspiracy arose in La Magione that attempted to assassinate Cesare Borgia. Although Ramiro, the governor of Romagna and vice commander of the Papal army was not involved in the conspiracy, Cesare suspected him and ordered his arrest on 22 December 1502. Under torture, he confessed to attempting to murder Cesare and present his head to the Orsini and the Baglioni families. In a summary trial, he was accused of corruption, treason, and tyranny and sentenced to death by decapitation.

On 26 December 1502, Ramiro was executed in the main plaza of Cesena, his body cut in two and his head stuck on a pike. Niccolò Machiavelli wrote in The Prince that Ramiro's bloody actions were what prompted Cesare to execute him and distance himself from his crimes.

References

1452 births
1502 deaths
16th-century condottieri
People from Lorca, Spain